Matías Prats Cañete MML (4 December 1913 – 8 September 2004) was a Spanish radio and television journalist. He was best known for his sports narrations and for being the narrator of the No-Do during part of the franquism period.

He is father of Matías Prats Luque, who is also a journalist and anchor on Antena 3 and grandfather of Matías Prats Chacón, a sports host in Telecinco.

Career
Shortly after the end of the Spanish Civil War Prats began his career as assistant on Radio Algeciras, later he moved to Málaga where he worked as announcer of bullfights on RNE and shortly after as football announcer.

In 1945 he returned to Madrid following the inauguration of the new RNE studios in Arganda del Rey. In 1947 he was promoted to head of the Department of Performing Stations and from the same year until 1971 he was responsible of the writing and speeching of the Noticiarios y Documentales Cinematográficos (No-Do).

He also worked in Televisión Española since its inception in 1956 until 1965 as announcer of football matches and bull fightings, credits on TVE include Pantalla deportiva (1959), La Copa (1963), Graderío (1963) and Ayer domingo (1965). He retired in 1985, however, works in radio ended in 1974.

Awards
1955: Premio Ondas as best sports announcer
1965: Premio Microfono de Oro
1965: Premio Ondas Special award due to his 20 years of work on RNE
1993: Premio Víctor de la Serna for best journalism work during the year
1996: Premio Ondas as best journalism work
1999: Premio ATV on radio
2000: Premio ATV for his life on radio

Honours 
 Gold Medal of Merit in Labour (Kingdom of Spain, 30 April 1998).

References

External links

1913 births
2004 deaths
People from Córdoba, Spain
Spanish radio personalities
Spanish television presenters
20th-century Spanish journalists